The RBY Mk 1 is a light armoured reconnaissance vehicle that was produced by the RAMTA Division of Israel Aircraft Industries. RBY is an anglicized acronym for "Rechev Ben-Yaacov". "Rechev" is Hebrew for "vehicle" and "Ben-Yaacov" is the last name of the creator of the vehicle, Yitzchak Ben-Yaacov (1919-2011). 

In Israel, the vehicle is known as the "Rabi", a pronunciation of the acronym.  It was replaced in Israeli service by the RAMTA RAM 2000 family of vehicles, though it continues to be used and upgraded by foreign users.  

The RBY Mk 1 is no longer marketed to new customers. It was known to be sold at $60,000.

History
RAMTA created the RBY MK 1 in order to get them sold to countries that wanted to get vehicles that are on a tight budget from the 1970s. By 1979, RAMTA has switched production from the RBY MK 1 to the RAM vehicles.

Design 
The RBY Mk 1 with a variety of potential applications in mind, including reconnaissance, commando operations, internal security, and long range patrols.

Considerable design effort was put into making the vehicle mine resistant - the wheels and axles were placed as far forward and backward as possible to maximize the distance of any detonation away from the crew and passengers, the bumpers were made of fiberglass so they would disintegrate in an explosion and minimize hazardous debris, the thickest armour was incorporated into the floor, and the floor and hull were shaped to channel explosions away from the vehicle. Other than modified Guatemalan versions, the RBY Mk 1 had no doors (crew entered through the open-topped passenger compartment) to ensure that the hull had no weak points.

The weight of the vehicle was kept light enough to make it transportable by heavy lift helicopters, such as the Sikorsky CH-53 Sea Stallion.

While the RBY Mk 1 featured no integral armament, provisions were made for up to five machine guns by placing pintle mounts at various points around the vehicle.

Passenger seating was provided with two back-to-back rows of three outward-facing seats. This allowed the passengers to maintain a full 360 degree field of view and operate any mounted machine guns.

Guatemalan upgrades 
In the mid-to-late 1990s, the Guatemalan Army began testing an upgraded and modified RBY MK 1. The new RBY MK 1 featured a new, more powerful diesel engine, a kevlar roof for what had been the open cargo/passenger box, and access doors on either side of the vehicle for the now-enclosed rear compartment. The roof incorporated a ring mount for a machine gun.

Variants

Recoilless rifle version 
A modified version of the RBY Mk 1 was produced which featured a 106mm recoilless rifle, 16 rounds of ammunition and crew positions in place of the normal passenger seating.

Anti-tank version
RBY Mk 1 with TOW missile launcher and two 7.62mm machine guns.

Anti-aircraft version
Armed with dual 20mm light anti-aircraft guns and 360 rounds of ammo.

APC version
Vehicle with three 7.62mm machine guns on turrets.

Mortar version
Vehicle with compartment for a mortar.

RAM MK3

Operators

Current
  - armed with TCM-20 anti-aircraft gun
 : 10
 : 8 RBY Mk 1 Recce and 8 RBY Mk 1 AT. The Honduran Army used them on 29 April 1983 after Salvadoran rebels of the Farabundo Martí National Liberation Front crossed the border.
 : 10
 : 10 - armed with TCM-20 AA guns and locally repowered

Former
 
 
 South Lebanon Army

See also 
"Combat Reconnaissance/Patrol Vehicle" with rear engine:
 Fennek
 D-442 FÚG
 ABC-79M
 BRDM-2
 Textron Tactical Armoured Patrol Vehicle

Others:
 RG-31 Nyala - A more modern mine protected vehicle
 MRAP - A family of vehicles designed to survive mine attacks and improvised explosive devices

References

Bibliography
Samer Kassis, 30 Years of Military Vehicles in Lebanon, Beirut: Elite Group, 2003. 
Zachary Sex & Bassel Abi-Chahine, Modern Conflicts 2 – The Lebanese Civil War, From 1975 to 1991 and Beyond, Modern Conflicts Profile Guide Volume II, AK Interactive, 2021. ISBN 8435568306073

Reconnaissance vehicles
Armoured cars of Israel
Armoured personnel carriers of Israel
Reconnaissance vehicles of the Cold War
Military vehicles introduced in the 1970s